This is a List of International Formula 3000 drivers, that is, a list of drivers who have made at least one race entry in the International Formula 3000 auto racing championship (also known as European Formula 3000) between 1985 and 2004. The list does not include data from non-championship races.

By name

By nationality

Notes

References

 
International Formula 3000